Pehria is a monotypic genus of plant in family Lythraceae. It has one known synonym, Grislea . The genus just contains one known species, Pehria compacta 

Its native range stretches from Central America down to Venezuela. It is found in Colombia, Honduras and Nicaragua.

Description
The leaves, the flowers and young stems are tinged with wine-red. They are puberulent (covered with minute soft erect hairs), with conspicuous glandular, globose, orange or black spots. The apex (end of the leaf) is acuminate and the base is narrowly attenuated (narrows gradually). The inflorescences appear in axillary, cymose, compound, lax racemes, which are placed at the ends of the branches. The flowers have four red, petals which are dotted-glandular.

Taxonomy
The genus name of Pehria is in honour of Pehr Löfling (1729–1756), a Swedish botanist and an apostle of Carl Linnaeus. The Latin specific epithet of compacta refers to compactus meaning dense or joined together.
both the genus and the species were first described and published in J. Bot. Vol.61 on page 238 in 1923.

Habitat

Birds have been observed in Venezuela eating the fruit of the plant.

References

Plants described in 1923
Flora of Honduras
Flora of Nicaragua
Flora of Venezuela
Flora of Colombia